Liv Maessen is an Australian pop singer who had hits in the early 1970s with "The Love Moth", "Knock, Knock Who's There?" and "Snowbird". In 1969, Maessen had finished second in the New Faces talent show. Her prize included a recording contract with Ron Tudor's Fable Records which released her albums, Live for Life (1971) and Best of Liv Maessen (1974). She won the 1971 Logie Award for 'Best New Talent'. In the Go-Set Pop Poll, Maessen was voted in the top 5 as most popular female vocalist in both 1970 and 1971. For her single "Knock, Knock Who's There?", Maessen became the first Australian female artist to be awarded a gold record certificate. After her recording career, Maessen turned to cabaret and club work by the mid-1970s.

Biography
In 1969 Maessen finished second on the series final of the TV talent show New Faces. Maessen was a mother of two children from Melbourne and signed with Ron Tudor's production company. In December Maessen released her debut single "The Love Moth", which was an English language cover version of an Italian song, "La Pioggia", by Gigliola Cinquetti. Maessen's version reached the Go-Set National Top 40 in April 1970 and was a top 10 hit in Melbourne. Maessen also appeared on local TV shows.

Maessen's second pop single, "Knock, Knock Who's There?" was a cover version of Mary Hopkin's entry in the Eurovision Song Contest 1970. It was released on Fable Records in April 1970 and peaked at No. 2. It co-charted with Hopkin's version. During the 1970 radio ban, a major dispute between commercial radio stations and record companies, Hopkin's version was not well known to Australian listeners. "Knock, Knock Who's There?" finished third on Go-Sets Top Records for the Year of 1970 and was the highest placed by an Australian artist. Maessen became the first Australian female artist to be awarded a gold record certificate for a single with sales of over 50,000. She won the 1971 George Wallace Memorial Logie for Best New Talent and in the Go-Set Pop Poll was voted in the top five as most popular female vocalist.

Maesson's third single, "Snowbird", was a country pop hit for Canadian singer Anne Murray. It was issued in August 1970 and peaked at No. 16. In March 1971 Maessen released her fourth single, "Hurry on Down", which did not chart. In mid-1971 she was again voted in the top five as most popular female vocalist by Go-Set readers. Her debut album, Live for Life, appeared in July with another single, "Here I Go Again", in October. She released "Love Is for the Two of Us" late in 1971 which was a duet with TV personality Jimmy Hannan. Two further singles followed in 1972 and her last commercial release was "Hey Mama, Sing Me a Song" in 1974 composed by Miki Gavrielov an Israeli singer song writer. After her recording career, Maessen turned to cabaret and club work by the mid-1970s.

Discography

Albums

Extended plays

Singles

Other appearances
 "Little Green Apples", "A New Love Day" on Channel 9 'New Faces' Discoveries by Various Artists (Fable Records, 1970)

Awards and nominations

Go-Set Pop Poll
The Go-Set Pop Poll was coordinated by teen-oriented pop music newspaper, Go-Set and was established in February 1966 and conducted an annual poll during 1966 to 1972 of its readers to determine the most popular personalities.

|-
| 1970
| herself
| Girl Vocal
| 4th
|-
| 1971
| herself
| Best Girl Vocal
| style="background:silver;"| 2nd
|-

References

General
  Note: Archived [on-line] copy has limited functionality.

Specific

Australian women singers
Australian television personalities
Women television personalities
Living people
Logie Award winners
Year of birth missing (living people)